The Wanting is the tenth studio album by American country music artist Cody Jinks. It was released on October 18, 2019 through Late August Records, one week after Jinks released his previous studio album After the Fire.

Critical reception
Stephen Thomas Erlewine of AllMusic states "The Wanting is lean and low-key, a record that doesn't push its themes or sounds too hard" and "perhaps Jinks has his tongue somewhat in cheek, but all the old outlaw signifiers are presented as sincere. That slight hint of self-awareness helps give The Wanting a lightness during its songs of alcoholism, loneliness, and lost love, a lightness that helps make the record a balm during tough times." Josh Schott of Country Perspective similarly gave the album a favorable review, rating it a "8/10" and writing that "The Wanting is an album full of deep introspection and some fun moments too".

Track listing

Chart positions

References

Cody Jinks albums
2019 albums
Albums recorded at Sonic Ranch